Nikola Stefanović (born 18 January 1960) is a Yugoslav rower. He competed in the men's quadruple sculls event at the 1980 Summer Olympics.

References

1960 births
Living people
Yugoslav male rowers
Olympic rowers of Yugoslavia
Rowers at the 1980 Summer Olympics
Place of birth missing (living people)